Marone Cinzano is an Italian surname. Notable people with the surname include:

 Enrico Marone Cinzano, an Italian artist and furniture designer 
 Francesco Marone Cinzano, an Italian businessman
 Noemi Marone Cinzano, an Italian businessperson

See also 

 Cinzano (disambiguation)